An abdomino perineal resection, formally known as abdominoperineal resection of the rectum and abdominoperineal excision of the rectum is a surgery for rectal cancer or anal cancer. It is frequently abbreviated as AP resection, APR and APER.

Indication and description
See image on National Cancer Institute website
The principal indication for AP resection is a rectal carcinoma situated in the distal (lower) one-third of the rectum. Other indications include recurrent or residual anal carcinoma (squamous cell carcinoma) following initial, usually definitive combination chemoradiotherapy.

APRs involves removal of the anus, the rectum and part of the sigmoid colon along with the associated (regional) lymph nodes, through incisions made in the abdomen and perineum. The end of the remaining sigmoid colon is brought out permanently as an opening, called a stoma, which is used by the patient in conjunction with a colostomy pouch, on the surface of the abdomen.

Centralisation of rectal surgery
This operation is one of the less commonly performed by general surgeons, although they are specifically trained to perform this operation. As low case volumes in rectal surgery have been found to be associated with higher complication rates, it is often centralised in larger centres, where case volumes are higher.

Laparoscopic approach
There are several advantages in terms of outcomes if the surgery can be performed laparoscopically

Relation to low anterior resection (LAR)
An APR, generally, results in a worse quality of life than the less invasive lower anterior resection (LAR). Thus, LARs are generally the preferred treatment for rectal cancer insofar as this is surgically feasible.

Eponym
It is named for William Ernest Miles (1869–1947), an English surgeon who published his technique in a landmark paper in 1908.

See also
 Stoma (medicine)

References

External links
 Laparoscopic Abdominoperineal Resection: Basic Surgical Steps—Cleveland Clinic
 APR Surgery Videos

General surgery
Digestive system surgery